Dan Curtis (born Daniel Mayer Cherkoss; August 12, 1927 – March 27, 2006) was an American director, writer, and producer of television and film, known among fans of horror films for his afternoon TV series Dark Shadows (1966–1971) and its 1991 remake, and TV films such as The Night Stalker (1972), Bram Stoker's Dracula (1974) and Trilogy of Terror (1975). He also directed three feature films – the Dark Shadows spinoffs House of Dark Shadows (1970) and Night of Dark Shadows (1971), and the supernatural horror Burnt Offerings (1976).

For general audiences, Curtis is also known as the director and producer of the highly-rated miniseries The Winds of War (1983) and its sequel War and Remembrance (1988), based on two novels by Herman Wouk, which follow the lives of two American families through World War II.

Career
Curtis's series of macabre films includes House of Dark Shadows, Night of Dark Shadows, The Night Stalker (for many years holding the record ratings of the most-watched TV movie—and inspired the series Kolchak: The Night Stalker), Intruders, The Night Strangler, Burnt Offerings, Trilogy of Terror and its belated sequel Trilogy of Terror II, The Norliss Tapes (a 1973 pilot for an unproduced series starring Roy Thinnes), Curse of the Black Widow, Dead of Night, and Scream of the Wolf. He worked frequently with sci-fi/horror writers Richard Matheson and William F. Nolan. Curtis was producer and/or director of a number of television adaptations of classic horror texts including The Strange Case of Dr. Jekyll and Mr. Hyde (1968), Frankenstein (1973), The Picture of Dorian Gray (1973), Dracula (1974), and The Turn of the Screw (1974).

In 1978, Curtis made a departure from his usual macabre offerings, when he wrote, produced, and directed the sentimental NBC television film When Every Day Was the Fourth of July.  Although fictionalized, the film was semi-autobiographical, based on his childhood growing up in Bridgeport, Connecticut in the 1930s.  The film was originally intended to be a pilot for a potential series, but when the series was not picked up by the NBC network, Curtis produced and directed the 1980 television movie sequel The Long Days of Summer, this time airing on the ABC network.

His 1983 miniseries The Winds of War was nominated for four Emmy Awards.

Curtis also directed the War and Remembrance miniseries, which was the continuation of The Winds of War. The program was 30 hours in length, split into two segments. Chapters I-VII aired in November 1988. The remaining five parts, Chapters VIII-XII, were billed as "The Final Chapter", and aired in May 1989. The miniseries received 15 Emmy Award nominations, including for best actor (John Gielgud), actress (Jane Seymour), supporting actor (Barry Bostwick), and supporting actress (Polly Bergen). The show won Emmys for best miniseries, special effects, and single-camera production editing.

The New York Times profiled Curtis while in post-production on War and Remembrance.

Curtis's rights to Dark Shadows remain with his estate, which signed a deal with Warner Bros. for a new Dark Shadows movie. The film stars Johnny Depp as Barnabas Collins, was directed by Tim Burton, and was released in May 2012. After the film's end credits, there is a dedication to Dan Curtis.

Personal life
Born Daniel Cherkoss in Bridgeport, Connecticut, Curtis attended Syracuse University before becoming a syndicated television show salesman.

Curtis died on March 27, 2006 at his home in  Brentwood, Los Angeles, California, twenty days after the death of his wife Norma.
He was survived by two daughters.

Filmography

As director

As producer

References

External links

1927 births
2006 deaths
American television directors
American television producers
Horror film directors
Dark Shadows
Deaths from brain cancer in the United States
Artists from Bridgeport, Connecticut
Film directors from Connecticut
Film producers from Connecticut